A Montreal Girl is a Canadian drama film, directed by Jeanne Crépeau and released in 2010. The film stars Amélie Grenier as Ariane, a lesbian filmmaker who has lived in the same apartment in Montreal's rapidly gentrifying Le Plateau-Mont-Royal district since her student days, but who is now confronted in her 40s with a renoviction notice giving her six months to vacate the apartment.

The film also stars Réal Bossé, Marie-Hélène Montpetit and Jean Turcotte as Ariane's core circle of friends.

Semi-autobiographical, the film started out as a documentary about Crépeau's own real-life eviction from her longtime apartment before evolving into a narrative fiction film, and was shot in her real apartment.

The film premiered at Montreal's Festival du nouveau cinéma in 2010, before going into limited commercial release in early 2011.

See also 
 List of LGBT films directed by women

References

External links

2010 films
2010 drama films
2010 LGBT-related films
Canadian drama films
Canadian LGBT-related films
Lesbian-related films
LGBT-related drama films
Films set in Montreal
Films shot in Montreal
French-language Canadian films
2010s Canadian films